Michael Carney (born January 9, 1982) is an American art director, creative director, and photographer. He is best known for his extensive, award winning visual work with the rock band the Black Keys, for whom his brother Patrick is the drummer.

Career
Carney has been the art director for The Black Keys since their creation, designing all of the band's album art.

In 2011, Carney won a Grammy for Best Recording Package for his work on The Black Keys' sixth studio album, Brothers. The album cover features a simple black backdrop with the text "This is an album by the Black Keys. The name of this album is Brothers." The group's label, Nonesuch, initially expressed confusion, but eventually gave the band, and Michael, their full support of the simplistic marketing. Inside the package, the album's disc was coated with a thermal film that changes colors (black and white) at different temperatures.

Later that year, Carney was profiled in the New York Times article, "The Incredible, Inevitable Shrinking Album Cover" by David Browne.

In 2011, The Black Keys released El Camino. The album cover, designed by Carney, features a Chrystler minivan instead of an El Camino.  According to Carney the look for the album cover was about capturing "the spirit of doing it the wrong way." A picture of a Chrysler minivan is printed on the album cover instead of an actual El Camino.

Personal life 
Carney's uncle, Ralph Carney, was a multi-instrumental musician perhaps best known for his work with Tom Waits. Ralph died on December 16, 2017, after sustaining head injuries from falling down steps in his Portland, Oregon, home.

Carney's father is a retired longtime Akron Beacon Journal reporter. His mother, Mary Stormer, is an Akron Municipal Court deputy clerk. His stepfather is Barry Stormer, owner of a residential design/construction firm. His stepmother is Katie Byard Carney, also a retired longtime Beacon Journal reporter. 

Carney attended Firestone High School in Akron, where he took art classes as part of the school's fine arts program. Carney graduated from the Columbus College of Art and Design.

Work with The Black Keys 

 The Big Come Up (2002) – art director 
 Thickfreakness (2003) – art director 
 Rubber Factory (2004) – art director 
 Magic Potion (2006) – art director 
 Attack & Release (2008) – art director 
 Brothers (2010) – art director 
 El Camino (2011) – art director
 Turn Blue (2014) – art director
 Let's Rock (2019) – art
 Delta Kream (2021) – art director

Awards and nominations

Grammy Awards

References

External links 

 
 
 

1982 births
Living people
American art directors
American photographers
Columbus College of Art and Design alumni
Grammy Award winners